Out in the Open may refer to:

Out in the Open (play), by Jonathan Harvey
Out in the Open (radio show), a Canadian public radio program (2016-2020)
"Out in the Open" (renegadepress.com), an episode of the television series renegadepress.com
Out in the Open (album), by Steep Canyon Rangers (2018)